5710 may refer to:

In general
 A.D. 5710, a year in the 6th millennium CE
 5710 BCE, a year in the 6th millennium BC
 5710, a number in the 5000 (number) range

Other uses
 5710 Silentium, an asteroid in the Asteroid Belt, the 5710th asteroid registered
 Hawaii Route 5710, a state highway

See also